Israel Amice (or Amyce, c.1548 - 1607) was an MP in Cornwall, representing St Mawes constituency. He was elected in the 1571 United Kingdom general election but did not return to Parliament after the next election.

Amice produced a survey map of Castle Hedingham in 1592 at the request of Lord Burghley, who employed him at the time.

References

1548 births
1607 deaths
People from Hertfordshire
English MPs 1571
Members of the Parliament of England for St Mawes